Statistics of Swiss Super League in the 1906–07 season.

East

Table

Central

Table

West

Table

Final

Table

Results 

|colspan="3" style="background-color:#D0D0D0" align=center|28 April 1907

|-
|colspan="3" style="background-color:#D0D0D0" align=center|5 May 1907

|-
|colspan="3" style="background-color:#D0D0D0" align=center|12 May 1907

|}

Servette Genf won the championship.

Sources 
 Switzerland 1906-07 at RSSSF

Seasons in Swiss football
Swiss Football League seasons
1906–07 in Swiss football
Swiss